The Maritime Museum of San Diego, established in 1948, preserves one of the largest collections of historic sea vessels in the United States. Located on the San Diego Bay, the centerpiece of the museum's collection is the Star of India, an 1863 iron bark. The museum maintains the MacMullen Library and Research Archives aboard the 1898 ferryboat Berkeley. The museum also publishes the quarterly peer-reviewed journal Mains'l Haul: A Journal of Pacific Maritime History.

The Maritime Museum at the Star of India Wharf is located on the west side of North Harbor Drive, between the ends of Ash Street and Grape Street, south of San Diego International Airport.

Vessels in the museum's collection

Current collection 
 Star of India, 1863 merchant bark, the oldest ship still sailing regularly and also the oldest iron-hulled merchant ship still afloat.
 Berkeley, 1898 ferryboat from the San Francisco Bay area
 Californian, 1984 replica of 1847 cutter C.W. Lawrence and official tall ship of the state of California
 America, 1995 replica of the 1851 yacht America that won the trophy now called the America's Cup 
 Medea, 1904 steam yacht that served in both World Wars
 Pilot, 1914 harbor pilot boat
 HMS Surprise, a 1970 replica of a Royal Navy frigate. Surprise was used in the film Master and Commander: The Far Side of the World. The ship also made an appearance in Pirates of the Caribbean: On Stranger Tides as HMS Providence.
  USS Dolphin, diesel-electric submarine launched in 1968 and decommissioned in 2007
 PCF-816 (formerly C24 or P24), 1968 Patrol Craft Fast that was transferred to Malta in 1971 and decommissioned in 2011
 San Salvador, a replica of Juan Rodríguez Cabrillo's galleon which was the fist european ship to visit San Diego Bay in 1542.
 A railroad barge is docked behind the Berkeley. Many guests mistake it for a floating dock because it no longer has its tracks. In the lower deck are workshops and storerooms used by the museum for the maintenance of the collection.

Former collection 

 B-39, Soviet Foxtrot class submarine; as of October 2021 the sub is being removed from the collection and sold for scrap. It was finally towed to a scrap yard in Ensenada in February 2022.

San Salvador replica
Starting in 2011 the Maritime Museum of San Diego built a full-sized, fully functional, historically accurate replica of Juan Rodríguez Cabrillo’s flagship, San Salvador. The replica was constructed in full public view in the bayside Spanish Landing park in San Diego, giving people the opportunity to watch a living recreation of the first modern industrial activity in the Americas. She was launched in 2015 and is stationed at the San Diego Bay Embarcadero as part of the Museum's fleet of historic and replica ships. She opened for public tours in September 2016 in conjunction with the Maritime Museum's annual Festival of Sail. Later that month she is expected to start making coastal tours up the California coast.

Gallery

Midway Museum
Not affiliated with the Maritime Museum, but located a short distance away, is the independently operated USS Midway Aircraft Carrier Museum. Although at first it was feared the Midway would compete with the Maritime Museum for visitors, in fact visitation of the Maritime Museum has increased since the Midway museum opened.

See also

 List of maritime museums in the United States
 List of museum ships

References

External links 

 

 
Maritime museums in California
Museums in San Diego
San Diego Bay
Museums established in 1948
1948 establishments in California
History of San Diego
Landmarks in San Diego
Maritime history of California